The Farthest Shore is a fantasy novel by the American author Ursula K. Le Guin, first published by Atheneum in 1972.  It is the third book in the series commonly called the Earthsea Cycle. As the next Earthsea novel, Tehanu, would not be released until 1990, The Farthest Shore is sometimes referred to as the final book in the so-called Earthsea trilogy, beginning with A Wizard of Earthsea. The events of The Farthest Shore take place several decades after The Tombs of Atuan and continue the story of the wizard Ged.

The Farthest Shore won the 1973 National Book Award in category Children's Books. Studio Ghibli's animated film Tales from Earthsea was based primarily on this novel.

Plot summary 
A strange, inexplicable malaise is spreading throughout Earthsea. Magic is losing its power; songs are being forgotten; people and animals are sickening or going mad. Accompanied by Arren, the young Prince of Enlad, the Archmage Ged leaves Roke Island to find the cause on his boat Lookfar. They head south to Hort Town, where they encounter a drug addled wizard called Hare. They realize that Hare and many others are under the malign influence of a powerful wizard, who is promising life after death. They head further south to the island of Lorbanery, once famous for its dyed silk. All knowledge of dyeing has been lost however, and the local people are apathetic and hostile.

Fleeing the sense of evil they encounter there, Ged and Arren head southwest, to the furthest parts of the Reaches. Increasingly, they come under the influence of the dark wizard. Ged is injured when they attempt to land on an island, and Arren does little to help him. He can feel his energy ebbing from him, and they both drift away on Lookfar out into the open ocean. They are saved by the Raft People, who live on great rafts in the open ocean, only coming to land once a year to repair them. The Raft People are so far unaffected by the spreading evil and Ged and Arren recover their strength there. However, the sickness reaches the Raft People on the shortest night of the year, when their singers are struck dumb, unable to remember the songs.

The dragon Orm Embar flies over the rafts and tells Ged to sail to Selidor, the westernmost isle of all Earthsea, and the home of the dragons. Orm Embar tells Ged that the dark wizard is there, and the dragons are powerless to defeat him without Ged. Ged and Arren set out to Selidor in Lookfar. They come to the Dragons' Run, a series of small islands south of Selidor, encountering dragons flying about in a state of madness. They manage to survive the Dragons' Run, and land in Selidor. Orm Embar is waiting for them, but he too has lost the power of speech. After a search, they find the wizard in a house of dragon bones at the extreme western end of Selidor – the end of the world.

Ged recognises the wizard as Cob, a dark mage whom he defeated many years before. After his defeat, Cob became an expert in the dark arts of how to cheat death and live forever. In doing so, he has opened a breach between the worlds, which is sucking all the life out of the world of the living. Cob and Ged confront each other, and Cob gains the upper hand. With the last of his wits, Orm Embar destroys Cob's physical body, but is killed in the process. The remains of Cob's body, which cannot be killed, crawl into the Dry Land of the dead, and Ged and Arren follow. In the Dry Land, Ged manages to defeat Cob and closes the breach in the world, but sacrifices all his magic power in the process.

When they return to the world of the living, after a dreadful journey over the Mountains of Pain, the dragon Kalessin carries them back to Roke Island. Kalessin leaves Arren on Roke and flies on with Ged to Gont, Ged's home island. Arren has fulfilled the prediction of the last King of Earthsea many centuries before: "He shall inherit my throne who has crossed the dark land living and come to the far shores of the day." In the intervening time, the realm had broken up into smaller principalities and domains, with little peace between them. Now that Arren will be crowned as King Lebannen (his true name), they can be reunited.

Le Guin originally offered two endings to the story. In one, after Lebannen's coronation, Ged sails alone out into the ocean and is never heard from again. In the other, Ged returns to the forest of his home island of Gont. In 1990, seventeen years after the publication of The Farthest Shore, Le Guin opted for the second ending when she continued the story in Tehanu.

Major characters

 Cob  A sorcerer whom Ged has met before.
 Ged  Archmage of Roke. Called Sparrowhawk.
 Kalessin  The eldest dragon.
 Lebannen  Young prince of Enlad.  The name means "rowan tree" in the Old Speech. Called Arren.
 Orm Embar  A powerful dragon of the West Reach descended from Orm.

Themes

Power and responsibility

Like both previous books in the trilogy, The Farthest Shore is a bildungsroman. The story is told mostly from the point of view of Arren, who develops from the boy who stands overawed in front of the masters of Roke, to the man who addresses dragons with confidence on Selidor, and who would eventually become the first King in centuries and unify the world of Earthsea.

Ged has also matured. He is no longer the impetuous boy who had himself opened a crack between the worlds in A Wizard of Earthsea, or the foolhardy young man who sailed the Dragon's Run and went alone into The Tombs of Atuan. Though the task before him is every bit as difficult and dangerous as any he had attempted before, necessity alone guides his actions now. Ged chooses between exercising power over others and power over himself, the latter revealing itself as a reluctance to resort to magic, as Arren asks: Ged replies "do nothing because it seems good to do so; do only that which you must do and which you cannot do in any other way."

Confronting one's shadow

In a sense, Cob is Ged's alter ego – a Ged who did not turn back from the dangerous road of summoning the dead, in which Ged dabbled in his youth, but continued along it to the ultimate conclusion. Thus, Ged's final confrontation with Cob and the closing of the hole between the worlds of the living and the dead is in fact a kind of repetition of his confrontation with the Shadow in the first book, who was Ged's alter ego in a more explicit way. Ged's closing of that evil hole, at the cost of completely losing his magic power (and very nearly his life), can also be considered as finally fulfilling his wish "to undo the evil" which as a youth he had expressed to then-Archmage Gensher (and which, as the Archmage told him, he was at the time not capable of achieving).

Balance

With a greater understanding of the Balance and Equilibrium that encompasses Earthsea (fundamental parts of Taoism, a philosophy Le Guin encourages in her works), and how life comes from death as much as death comes from life (death itself being a balancing force in the book), Ged is portrayed as a wiser and sager archmage.

Reception

Reviewing the novel for a genre audience, Lester del Rey reported that it was "fantasy with a logic of execution that is usually found only in science fiction ... rich in ideas, color and inventions".

Notes

References

Bibliography

External links
  
 

Earthsea novels
1972 American novels
1972 children's books
1972 fantasy novels
American young adult novels
Young adult fantasy novels
National Book Award for Young People's Literature winning works
American fantasy novels adapted into films
Sequel novels
Dragons in popular culture
Atheneum Books books